Charles Francis "Chooka" May (17 February 1899 – 2 May 1989) was an Australian rules footballer who played with and coached Essendon in the Victorian Football League (VFL). He was the father of double Essendon premiership player Wally May.

A centreman in his playing days, May was a member of Essendon's back to back premiership sides of 1923 and 1924. His last game of football was in the 1926 finals series where Essendon fell a goal short of qualifying for the Grand Final and May ended up with a suspension for striking Bob Corbett of Melbourne. He was non-playing coach of Essendon in 1934 and 1935 and it his later years remained involved with the club as a trainer. May also spent time in South Australia where he coached Glenelg Football Club.

References

External links
Charlie May's playing statistics from The VFA Project

Charlie May's coaching statistics from AFL Tables

1899 births
Australian rules footballers from Victoria (Australia)
Essendon Football Club players
Essendon Football Club Premiership players
Essendon Football Club coaches
North Melbourne Football Club (VFA) players
Brunswick Football Club players
Glenelg Football Club coaches
1989 deaths
Two-time VFL/AFL Premiership players